The Dollar Album is the third and final studio album by pop vocal duo Dollar, released on 22 October 1982 by WEA Records. The album featured five Top 40 hit singles, including their biggest "Mirror Mirror".

Background
By its release in 1982, Dollar had seen a revival in fortunes following their previous, unsuccessful album The Paris Collection (1980). After teaming up with producer Trevor Horn in 1981, the group had enjoyed their biggest success with four hit singles; "Hand Held in Black and White", "Mirror Mirror (Mon Amour)", "Give Me Back My Heart" and "Videotheque" - all of which reached the UK Top 20. Members David Van Day and Thereza Bazar began work on a new album and wrote and produced the remainder of the tracks themselves. Although all their own songs were credited as joint compositions, a number of them were written by only one of them, such as "Dangerous Blondes", "Guessing Games" and "Anyone Who's Anyone" by Bazar and "You Made Me Love You" and "I Got Your Number Wrong" by Van Day.

The production was also largely handled by Bazar herself after she had spent much time working closely with Horn in the studio. A fifth single, "Give Me Some Kinda Magic", was released to coincide with the album. Although it became another Top 40 hit, it failed to chart as highly as the previous four singles. Despite containing five Top 40 singles and a television advertising campaign, the album itself did not fare as well as expected, though it still became their biggest seller, peaking at No. 18 (their highest-charting album) and was certified Silver by the BPI. Thereza Bazar has since said of the album that she is proud of their own songs (particularly "Pink and Blue") but regrets that Trevor Horn couldn't have worked on more of it. She says that the four songs he did with them were very expensive due to the vast amount of time spent in the studio on them, but they were "worth every penny".

In early 1983, Dollar were on a promotional tour of Japan with their new single "Two Hearts". The formerly dating couple were by this time finding it difficult to continue working together and decided to split. The single was never released in the UK. Dollar reformed in 1986 and despite four single releases, including a Top 10 hit, the group never released another album.

Many of the tracks on this album were released on compact disc on a 2006 compilation, The Platinum Collection. The whole album was released on compact disc in February 2010 by Cherry Red Records, and included six bonus tracks.

Track listing
Side one
"Mirror Mirror (Mon Amour)" (Trevor Horn, Bruce Woolley) – 3:30
"Give Me Back My Heart" (Horn, Simon Darlow) – 5:01
"Hand Held in Black and White" (Horn, Woolley) – 3:20
"Pink and Blue" (David Van Day, Thereza Bazar) – 4:13
"I Got Your Number Wrong" (Van Day, Bazar) – 3:49
"Guessing Games" (Van Day, Bazar) – 3:42

Side two
"Give Me Some Kinda Magic" (Van Day, Bazar) – 3:43
"Videotheque" (Horn, Darlow) – 3:34
"Dangerous Blondes" (Van Day, Bazar) – 4:13
"You Made Me Love You" (Van Day,  Bazar) – 4:09
"Anyone Who's Anyone" (Van Day, Bazar) – 3:18
"The Second Time Around" (Van Day, Bazar) – 5:01

Bonus tracks (2010 re-issue)
"Hand Held in Black and White" (Alternative Trevor Horn 1981 Mix) – 3:21
"Mirror Mirror" (Alternative Trevor Horn 1981 Mix) – 3:52
"Give Me Back My Heart" (Alternative Trevor Horn 1982 Mix) – 5:13
"Videotheque" (Alternative Trevor Horn 1982 Mix) – 3:33
"I Got Your Number Wrong" (Alternative Mix) – 4:24
"Guessing Games" (Alternative Mix) – 3:51

Personnel
Credits are adapted from The Dollar Album liner notes.

Musicians
David Van Day – vocals
Thereza Bazar – vocals
Graham Broad – LinnDrum, Simmons kit, percussion
John Reid – bass guitar
William C Lyall – piano, keyboards, synthesizers
Richard Cottle – Prophet-5 synthesizer
Danny McIntosh Jr. – guitar
Trevor Horn – bass guitar
Bruce Woolley – keyboards, synthesizers
Simon Darlow – keyboards, synthesizers
Anne Dudley – keyboards, synthesizers
George McFarlane – bass guitar

Production and artwork
Thereza Bazar and David Van Day – production on tracks 4, 5, 6, 7, 9, 10, 11, 12
Trevor Horn – production on tracks 1, 2, 3, 8
Thereza Bazar, David Van Day, William C. Lyall – arrangements
Gerry Kitchingham – engineer
Gary Langan – engineer
Stefano Massimo – photography
Nicky Clarke – hair
Glauca Rossi – make-up
Bill Smith – design

Chart performance

References

External links
 

1982 albums
Albums produced by Trevor Horn
Dollar (band) albums
Warner Music Group albums